Hotel is a 1965 novel by Arthur Hailey.  It is the story of an independent New Orleans hotel, the St. Gregory, and its management's struggle to regain profitability and avoid being assimilated into the O'Keefe chain of hotels.  The St. Gregory is supposedly based on the Roosevelt Hotel, although the old St. Charles Hotel is also cited as the basis for the novel.

Adaptations
The novel was adapted into a movie in 1967, and in 1983 Aaron Spelling turned it into a television series, airing for five years on ABC.  In the TV series the St. Gregory Hotel was moved from New Orleans to San Francisco.

Characters
 Peter McDermott, manager
 Warren Trent, proprietor
 Christine Francis, secretary to Warren Trent
 Herbie Chandler, villainous Bell Captain
 Aloysius Royce, administrative assistant to Warren Trent
 Curtis O'Keefe, owner of the O'Keefe chain
 Dorothy "Dodo" Lash, O'Keefe's starlet companion
 Albert Wells, aging hotel guest
 The Duke and Duchess of Croydon, guests in the Presidential Suite
 Ogilvie, house detective
 Julius "Keycase" Milne, hotel thief
 Marsha Preyscott, one night guest in the hotel

Plot
Peter McDermott: The main character is Mr. Peter McDermott; the general manager with a past.  He is a graduate in Hotel Management from Cornell University and subsequently got a job in a hotel.  However, he had been involved with a lady at a time when he was supposed to be on duty.  This gave Peter's wife and the lady's husband a reason to ask for a divorce.  McDermott's dalliance was not a big thing for the hotel, but the newspaper coverage was such that he was dismissed from his job and blacklisted.  But Warren Trent, the head of the St. Gregory Hotel, ignoring the past and considering the skill, hired him.  The novel is about McDermott's attempts to deal with several crises in the hotel which involve a range of other characters.

The Hotel Finance Problem: The hotel's unpayable and unrenewable mortgage is due on Friday, necessitating its sale.  Curtis O'Keefe, who owns a large hotel chain, plans to buy the St. Gregory hotel, as the O'Keefe chain did not have a hotel in New Orleans. They had offered to pay the two million due on the mortgage and one million dollar and living accommodation to Warren Trent as well.  However Warren did not want to lose the hotel which he had nurtured for so long. They decided upon a deadline of Friday afternoon to make a decision on the deal.
Warren Trent meanwhile decided to make a deal with the Journeyman's Union who had long wanted to enter the hotel Industry but were not successful. This way Warren Trent could maintain the hotel's independence and still have a say in its affairs. The Journeyman's Union had decided to send two of its executives on Thursday to study the hotel books and then decide before the Friday afternoon deadline.  Royall Edwards of the St. Gregory had been appointed by Warren Trent to work with the two officers all night, if required, so that they could complete the study.  However, upset with the denial of entry of a Negro man to the hotel, which made headlines, the Journeyman's Union broke the deal.  Warren Trent had no option but to give in to Curtis O'Keefe. To his utmost surprise, a few minutes before Friday noon, the bank manager who had turned down refinancing of the hotel, came with an offer, that an individual, whose name could not be disclosed then, would be paying the mortgage and buying the major shares of the hotel.  Warren Trent would be the chairman, though Warren knew that he would be just a figurehead, but as it was a better offer, so he accepted.

Christine and Albert Wells: Christine is Warren Trent's secretary.  Peter and Christine have a liking for each other. They share many things in common and feel they could be happy together.  In the hotel, an elderly guest, Mr. Albert Wells, suffers a medical problem in his room.  The hotel staff is alert and quickly moves him to another room.  Christine took care of Albert Wells personally as he was the hotel guest.

Marsha Preyscott: In another incident a group of teen-aged boys create a major incident that is aggravated by the fact that they are the sons of the local banker, car dealer, and other town notables.  They attempt to rape Miss Prescott, the daughter of Mr. Prescott, a department store magnate, who is currently in Rome.  However, on hearing her screams, Aloysius Royce (a Negro and main help to Warren Trent, who treats him like a son) steps in and Marsha is able to escape.  Peter handles the situation and asks for a written apology from each of the boys involved in it.  In these letters, the villainous Bell Captain Herbie Chandler is named as the one who made the incident possible.  Because of his collusion in this, Chandler is threatened with firing on the spot; however, McDermott plans to take it to Mr. Trent, because of Chandler's years of employment.  Chandler attempts to bribe the general manager, but fails, and is told to leave the office in a cold rage.  Chandler plots some kind of revenge against McDermott, and he steps on elevator number 4.
Marsha falls in ‘love’ with Peter McDermott and proposes marriage.  Peter finds it difficult to say no to her considering her affluence and beauty, but finally says no as he knows that he likes Christine.  However he overcomes his sense of guilt when he learns from Anna (Marhsa's head maidservant) that she is always the same and will be OK in a short time - and that Anna was never married.  However, Marsha, in framing a good background to convince Peter, had said that Anna had a very good life with her husband whom she had met only once before marriage, and it was not necessary to know a person for too long before to decide on marriage.

The Dentist Convention: The hotel business gains a minimum from room rent, the bulk of its profit coming from the food and the conventions held.  A major convention of dentists was supposed to be held in the St. Gregory.  Dr Ingram, the president of the convention, has arrived and settled in his room.  Then a Dr. Nicholas, a prominent Negro dentist and university lecturer, arrives at the counter, showing a confirmed reservation.  However hotel policy does not allow Negroes.  Dr Ingram was quite disappointed at this and threatened to take the convention out of the hotel, causing a major loss.  When Peter discussed it with Warren, he said that after a few discussions this would be forgotten, the convention would be held, and there was no need to worry.  And after a few meetings the convention finally decided to stay, though Dr. Ingram resigned from his post.

Curtis O'Keefe and Dodo: Curtis O'Keefe, who owns a large hotel chain, plans to buy the St. Gregory.  He is there with Dodo, his girlfriend.  But Curtis wants to move on.  He gets a movie role for Dodo and intends to go to New York to meet his new girlfriend.  When Warren tells Curtis that he is not going to accept Curtis' offer to sell the hotel, Curtis is very disappointed and in a fit of anger he tells Dodo that he doesn't want her any more.  Dodo is upset, although somehow she already knows.  She has to board her flight to Los Angeles and takes elevator number 4, as she is about to move out of the hotel.

Duke and Duchess of Croydon: In another instance the Duke and Duchess of Croydon are hiding out in the hotel as they are responsible for a gruesome hit-and-run accident which made the headlines.  The Duke had gone to a night club, where the Duchess found her husband.  On their way back the Duke hit a woman and her daughter, both of whom died.  However, in the accident the headlight and the trim ring of the car were damaged.  The Duke and Duchess arrived back at the hotel to try to find a way out, so that there would not be the slightest suggestion of them being involved in an accident.  When the room-service waiter arrives in the presidential suite with dinner, the Duchess intentionally hits him so that her dress gets spoiled.  The Duchess creates a big issue over this just to make her presence felt, so that it can be interpreted that she was in the hotel.  But the chief house officer Ogilvie gets a hint of it and tries to blackmail the Duke and Duchess.  They finally reach an agreement that Ogilvie would drive their Jaguar to Chicago and a total of twenty-five thousand dollars would be paid to him.  By the time the police could identify the car with the broken headlight and trim pieces, Ogilvie would be out of New Orleans.  His departure was scheduled to be at 1 am Thursday.  Ogilvie gets a written note from the Duchess asking for permission to drive her car out of the garage in case the garage officer asks for it.  The moment he is driving the car out of hotel, Peter enters the hotel and they make eye contact, though Peter does not think much of it at the time.  However, recollecting all the events – a Jaguar belonging to the Duke and Duchess being driven by Ogilvie – the broken headlight of the Jaguar – the fuss created by Duchess about the waiter – all establish a link towards the involvement of the Duke and Duchess.  Peter inquires from the garage officer and is informed that Ogilvie had a written note from the Duchess and so was allowed to drive the car away, but somehow the note got misplaced.  Peter informed police captain Yolles of the incident, but they could not prove it without any evidence.  After working hard, the attendant responsible for garbage recycling, manages to find the note.  When the note is shown to the Duchess, she frowns.  The Duke then decides to admit his crime and decides to leave and steps into elevator number 4.

Keycase Milne: A hotel thief operating in the St. Gregory.  He has managed to get keys of several rooms in the hotel by using tricks, asking for other room number keys from the reception desk, using girls to obtain keys for him, among many other ways.  When he saw the Duke and Duchess in the hotel he thinks it would be excellent if he could get the key of their room.  He manages to get the key from reception by trickery, gets a duplicate prepared, and steals fifteen thousand dollars and some jewelry from the Duchess's room.  After obtaining so much he decides to leave the hotel and boards elevator number 4.

Climax: The meeting to take over the hotel scheduled at 11:30 am Friday is in place.  Mr. Dempster from New York arrives to reveal who his boss is, and it is Albert Wells, the hotel guest whom Christine had taken care of, not thinking of him as a rich man, who has bought the hotel.  To Peter's complete surprise, he is appointed the Executive Vice-President of the St. Gregory and would be running the hotel with Dempster as officiating president, the position Dempster had in all other hotels owned by Albert Wells.  During the meeting Christine comes running and tells them that elevator number 4 has met with an accident and had a free fall, killing a worker.

Actually, several passengers were killed, including an elderly couple. Dodo, suffering from serious injurie, is rushed to a hospital.  It it then that Curtis realizes how much he loves Dodo and gets the best neurosurgeons for her.  She is soon out of danger.  The Duke, on the other hand, was killed instantly.  The Duchess, in shock upon hearing that, is expressionless.  The policeman, Captain Yolles, now thinks the blame for the hit-and-run could be easily moved onto the Duke, as he is now dead, and the Duchess could save herself.  Herbie Chandler, the bell captain, is permanently paralyzed and never works again.  Keycase escapes unharmed and runs away with all his money, vowing to go straight.  Warren Trent is happy that he could retain his hotel as its chairman.  Aloysius Royce leaves the hotel to study law but not before he and McDermott have a drink together.

Structure of novel
The novel features multiple unfolding plot lines which take place over a period of five weekdays, Monday through Friday.  Some days feature self-contained episodes exploring particular elements of the routine of a large hotel in detail.  Meg Yetmein, the cleaning lady, "gets hers back" by smuggling out steaks under her clothing toward the end of her shift; Tom Earlshore, the fired bartender, does much the same by "skimming" liquor. Other brief episodes explain techniques used by prostitutes in entering and exiting the hotel undetected, and the various methods used by the hotel thief.

Background to writing
Hailey worked on the novel for two and a half years, finishing in June 1964. He says his wife Sheila was of great assistance with the research. The book clubs, essential for sales of Hailey's book, originally rejected the novel. However, when the book was read in galleys three studios bid on the movie rights and it was sold to Warner Bros who wanted Hailey to write the screenplay. The book became a best seller, Hailey's most successful to date.

References

1965 British novels
Novels by Arthur Hailey
Canadian novels adapted into films
Canadian novels adapted into television shows
1965 Canadian novels
Novels set in hotels
Novels set in New Orleans
Doubleday (publisher) books
British novels adapted into films
British novels adapted into television shows